Para sa Broken Hearted is a 2018 Filipino drama film written and directed by Digo Ricio, starring Yassi Pressman, Sam Concepcion, Marco Gumabao, Louise delos Reyes and Shy Carlos. The film was produced by Viva Films and it was released in the Philippines on 3 October 2018.

Cast

References

External links

Philippine drama films
Viva Films films